Herbert Faulkner Copeland (May 21, 1902 – October 15, 1968) was an American biologist who contributed to the theory of biological kingdoms.  He grouped unicellular organisms into 2 large kingdoms: the Monera kingdom and the Protista kingdom. In 1966, he included bacteria and one of the most primitive algae, called blue green algae, under Monera kingdom.

His father was Edwin Copeland who was also the founder of the College of Agriculture at the University of the Philippines Los Banos and a leading pteridologist.

Bibliography 
 "The kingdoms of organisms", Quarterly review of biology v.13, p. 383-420, 1938.
 The classification of lower organisms, Palo Alto, Calif., Pacific Books, 1956.

References 

1902 births
1968 deaths
20th-century American botanists
Scientists from Chicago